İncesu may refer to:

Places
 İncesu, Aksaray, a village in Aksaray Province, Turkey
 İncesu, Horasan
 İncesu, Kayseri, a town in Kayseri Province, Turkey
 İncesu, İspir
 İncesu, Ortaköy
 İncesu, Osmancık
 İncesu, Silvan
 İncesu, Taşköprü, a village in Turkey
 İncesu, Vezirköprü, a village in Samsun Province, Turkey

People with the name
 Remzi Sedat İncesu (born 1972), Turkish basketball player

Turkish-language surnames